Khodair al-Khozaei (also transliterated as Khudayir al-Khuza'i; born 20 June 1947) served as Vice President of Iraq between 2011 and 2014. He is a member of the Islamic Dawa Party - Iraq Organisation party.

He was appointed by Prime Minister Nouri al-Maliki in May 2006. 

He was born in 1947 in Maysan and obtained Doctorate in the Philosophy of Islamic thought and Quranic Studies. He worked in universities and has written books on Quranic interpretation.

He was elected to the Iraqi National Assembly in January 2005 and December 2005 as part of the United Iraqi Alliance list.

References

1947 births
Living people
People from Maysan Governorate
Iraqi Shia Muslims
Islamic Dawa Party – Iraq Organisation politicians
Vice presidents of Iraq
Members of the Council of Representatives of Iraq